Finnish national road 3 ( or) is a highway in Finland between Helsinki and Vaasa via Hämeenlinna and Tampere. North of Tampere, the road is mostly two-lane road, with a share of 2+1 road. The busiest point on Highway 3 is in Helsinki, north of the Ring I junction, where the average traffic volume is about 90,000 vehicles per day.

Back in the late 1950s before the current freeway, the Finnish regional road 132 (Mt 132) was the former main road to Hämeenlinna and Tampere via Loppi and Janakkala.

Route

The route of the road is: Helsinki – Vantaa – Nurmijärvi – Hyvinkää – Riihimäki – Janakkala – Hämeenlinna – Hattula – Kalvola – Valkeakoski – Akaa – Valkeakoski (again) – Lempäälä – Tampere – Pirkkala – Nokia – Tampere (again) – Ylöjärvi – Hämeenkyrö – Ikaalinen – Parkano – Jalasjärvi – Kurikka – Ilmajoki – Isokyrö – Laihia – Korsholm – Vaasa.

Highway 3 starts in Helsinki at the end of the Mannerheimintie street. Between the Kivihaka and Ring III, Highway 3 is a high-quality four-lane highway, all connections of which are interchanges (except the motorway). The entire section between Ring III and the town of Ylöjärvi is a four-lane motorway. At 180 kilometers long, it is the longest motorway in Finland. In the Greater Helsinki, the road is also called Hämeenlinnanväylä, sometimes in colloquial language also Tampereenväylä. The former name of the road is Nurmijärventie, referring to the municipality of Nurmijärvi along the way. The traffic volumes on the highway are quite high all the way. For example, in the case of Riihimäki, the volume of road traffic is about 30,000 vehicles per day.

Highway 3 runs right next to the city center at Hämeenlinna. This throughway is the first section of the road and the third section of the Finnish motorway, which was completed in 1964. Attention has also been paid to the aesthetics of the highway environment. Some of the bridges at Highway 3 can be considered almost works of art and the rock cuts have been illuminated. Ekku Peltomäki's light art work Lux Tavastia is next to Akaa's Terisjärvi.

To the south of Tampere city center, Highway 3 turns onto Tampere's western ring road, which is also a motorway. The western ring road was completed as a two-lane road, partly as a two-lane expressway in 1985. The motorway ends slightly west of the center of Ylöjärvi, and the highway turns from the ring road at the Elovainio interchange to the road between Tampere and Vaasa. Between Ylöjärvi and Vaasa, Highway 3 is a standard Finnish two-lane highway, the quality of which varies. Some of the major interfaces have been upgraded to intermodal interfaces. In addition, there is an 11-kilometer-long motorway between Korsholm's Helsingby and Vaasa. The road ends in the center of Vaasa.

See also
 Highways in Finland
 Lopentie
 Åland Islands Highway 3

References

External links

Matti Grönroos – Valtatie 3 

Roads in Finland
Transport in Tampere